The 8th District of the Iowa House of Representatives in the state of Iowa.

Current elected officials
Terry Baxter is the representative currently representing the district.

Past representatives
The district has previously been represented by:
 Del Stromer, 1971–1973
 Terry Branstad, 1973–1979
 Clifford Branstad, 1979–1983
 Kenneth De Groot, 1983–1993
 Daniel P. Fogarty, 1993–1995
 William R. Salton, 1995–1997
 Marcella Frevert, 1997–2003
 Dolores Mertz, 2003–2011
 Tom W. Shaw, 2011–2013
 Henry Rayhons, 2013–2015
 Terry Baxter, 2015–present

References

008